Søren Krarup (born 3 December 1937) is a Danish pastor, writer, and politician, who was a Member of Parliament (MP) for the Danish People's Party from 2001 to 2011.

Krarup is a significant and influential critic from the Danish national conservative movement, as well as the theological movement Tidehverv. He has written several books about Christianity, history and politics, and is regarded by both his supporters and many of his opponents as a great intellectual capacity. He has been regarded as the main ideologue of the Danish People's Party, although he rejects the particular term himself, as he regards "love for the fatherland" not to be an ideology or "-ism", but rather a fundamental precondition for one's life. He is a noted critic of Cultural Radicalism (Danish cultural relativist movement), Marxism and official Danish social policy, EU policy and immigration and refugee policy.

He has, like a number of other prominent Danish politicians from the Danish People's Party, been a member of Den Danske Forening, but along with party members Jesper Langballe and Søren Espersen resigned from the association in 2002 after it had publicly compared Islam with the plague. In 2007, while he was still not a member of the association, he however stated in a speech at its jubilee that he continued to hold its magazine "with great pleasure", and said he regarded the association as "the freedom fighters of our time".

Political controversies
Krarup created a minor stir in December 2007 by announcing that he would like to see Scania, Halland and Blekinge reunited with Denmark, if they expressed such a desire through a referendum. He also expressed the view that all members of the Danish minority in Schleswig ought to carry the hope that at some future time Denmark's border should be extended to the Eider river, restoring Danish rule over Southern Schleswig which is now part of Germany.

Krarup has stated that he considers gay people to be "handicapped" people suffering from an "abominable disease", who should be subject to "compulsory registration". Following the 2017 French presidential election, Krarup caused a minor controversy by referring to President-elect Emmanuel Macron as a "pretty little gayboy".

In Krarup's opinion, corporal punishment of children is "not harmful".

Personal life
Krarup was born in Grenaa, to vicar Vilhelm Krarup and Bodil Marie Krarup (née Langballe). He is married to Anette Elisabeth (née Lund Steen), with whom he has four children, one of whom, Marie, has also entered politics. He is the grandson of Alfred Krarup and cousin of Jesper Langballe and Ole Krarup.

Krarup graduated from Christianshavns Gymnasium in 1957 and cand.theol. in 1965. He has been vicar in Seem and resident curate at Ribe Cathedral from 1965 to 2005 and ward chairman from 1965. He was director of Studenterkredsen from 1961 to 1963. From 2000 to 2001 he represented his party on the board of DR. He was from 1965 co-publisher of Tidehverv, and editor from 1984.

In October 2000 he was listed as the Danish People's Party candidate in Sønderborg and was elected to parliament for the Sønderjylland constituency on 20 November 2001.

Krarup has an extensive writing career behind him, as he from 1960 to 2001 published 26 books. Especially through his role in Tidehverv and as MP for the Danish People's Party, he has had great influence on modern Danish theology and modern Danish national conservative politics.

Bibliography 
 Harald Nielsen og hans tid (1960)
 Hørups Arv og Arvtagere (1961)
 Demokratisme (1968)
 Om at ofre sig for menneskeheden og ofre menneskene (1969)
 Den hellige hensigt (1969)
 Præstens prædiken (1971)
 At være eller ikke være (1971)
 Den danske dagligdag (1973)
 Fædreland og Folkestyre (1974)
 Selvbesindelse (1976)
 Forsvar for familien 1977)
 Den politiske syge (1979)
 Verden Var (1979)
 Loven (1980)
 Fordringen (1982)
 Det moderne Sammenbrud (1984)
 Begrebet Anstændighed (1985)
 I Virkeligheden (1986)
 Det tavse flertal (1987)
 Synd tappert! (1990)
 Dansk kultur (1993)
 Den danske nødvendighed (1994)
 Den kristne tro. Katekismus for voksne (1995)
 I min levetid. 60 års Danmarkshistorie (1998)
 Dansen om menneskerettighederne (2000)
 Kristendom og danskhed (2001)
 "Kære Søren, en brevveksling om det nye Danmarks kurs" (with Søren Pind) (2003)
 Systemskiftet (2006)

References

1937 births
Danish Lutheran clergy
Living people
Danish People's Party politicians
People from Norddjurs Municipality
Members of the Folketing 2001–2005
Members of the Folketing 2005–2007
Members of the Folketing 2007–2011